Saraab is a Pakistani psychological drama television series broadcast on Hum TV from 20 August 2020 to 11 March 2021. It is written by Edison Idrees, directed by Mohsin Talat and produced by Moomal Shunaid under banner Moomal Entertainment. It stars Sami Khan as Asfandyar and Sonya Hussain as Hoorain, the former's eventual wife suffering from schizophrenia.

Plot 

Hoorain is different from the people around her and lives at a distance from them. She likes her cousin Asfandyar and wants to marry him. She is ignored by her parents (as her sisters Namal and Warda are clever and sharp-minded) and lives in a separate room at upper story of the house. These factors contribute to Hoorain becoming a victim of schizophrenia. Things become complicated when she starts to act like a schizophrenic. She has hallucinations and consider everyone as her enemy. Asfandyar discovers about her disease and helps her but things become complicated and interwoven. Asfand and Hoorain get married, and soon Hoorain discovers she is pregnant which further complicates her schizophrenia. The doctor warns Asfand that pregnancy could lead to Hoorain having more psychotic attacks. Hoorain is admitted for therapy until she visibility starts getting better. Warda, Hoorain sister tries to instigate her against Asfand. Meanwhile, Hoorain suffers a complicated delivery after another of her hallucinations and her mother prays that her baby will be a boy, as every girl would not have a husband as kind and understanding as Asfandyar if the baby inherited her disease. Hoorain gives birth to a healthy boy, who is named Sheheryar. he story is Asfandyar's struggle to help Hoorain recover from this disease. Hoorain is readmitted in the hospital after her hallucinations about Sheheryar, and three months later Asfandyar comes to take her back home as she has recovered, but she fakes losing her memory. However, the name Sheheryar slips out of her mouth, which leads to Asfand discovering she was faking losing her memory as she remembers Sheheryar clearly. Hoorain then reveals she faked this because she wanted to protect her child from her crazy hallucinations and thought she was incapable of raising Sheheryar. Asfand then consoles her and they both embrace, going back home.

Ten years later Asfand, Hoorain and Sheheryar are shown to be living peacefully, and Hoorain has not overcome her schizophrenia completely, but she is learning to control it because of Asfand's patience and treatment.

Cast 

 Sonya Hussain as Hoorain “Hoor”
 Sami Khan as Asfandya “Asfand”
 Nazish Jahangir as Namal, Hoorain's sister
 Ghana Ali as Warda, Hoorain's elder sister
 Aurangzeb Laghari as Hoorain's father
 Fareeda Shabbir as Hoorain's Mother
 Sajid Shah as Asfandyar's father
 Kinza Malik as Asfandyar's mother
 Ejaz Khan as Nadir, Warda's husband
 Humaira Zahid as Warda's mother-in-law
 Jahanzeb Khan as Sufiyan; Wards's brother-in-law
 Pareezay Fatima as Huma, Asfandyar's sister
 Shafqat Khan as Asfandyar's friend

Soundtrack

The original soundtrack of the show was released on 13 August 2020. The music was composed and sung by Naveed Nashad while lyrics were written by Qamar Nashad.

Production 

In early 2020, it was announced that Sami Khan and Sonya Hussain, previously starred together in Ishq Zahe Naseeb are working together on a project and, later it was also revealed that the latter will play a schizophrenic in the series. By the April 2020, the 70% shot has been completed which was earlier postponed by COVID-19 pandemic.
The first and second teaser of the show was released on the 4 August 2020.

Reception

The series garnered critical praise due to its subject of schizophrenia and Hussyn's performance. It received negative reviews due to the track of scheming sisters.

Awards and nominations

References

External links 
 Official website

2020 Pakistani television series debuts
Urdu-language television shows
Pakistani drama television series
Hum TV
Hum TV original programming
MD Productions
Pakistani television series